The Department of Immigration and Citizenship (DIAC) was an Australian government department that existed between January 2007 and September 2013, that was preceded by the Department of Immigration and Multicultural Affairs and was succeeded by the Department of Immigration and Border Protection.

Scope
Information about the department's functions and/or government funding allocation could be found in the Administrative Arrangements Orders, the annual Portfolio Budget Statements, in the department's annual reports and on the department's website.

According to the Administrative Arrangements Order (AAO) made on 3 December 2007, the department dealt with:
Entry, stay and departure arrangements for non-citizens
Border immigration control
Arrangements for the settlement of migrants and humanitarian entrants, other than migrant child education
Citizenship
Ethnic affairs
Multicultural affairs

Structure
The department was an Australian Public Service department, staffed by officials who were responsible to the Minister for Immigration and Citizenship. The secretary of the department was at first Andrew Metcalfe (until 2012), then (acting in the position) Martin Bowles. Bowles was appointed permanent secretary in early 2013.

gainst this plaintiff.

References

Ministries established in 2007
Immigration and Citizenship
2007 establishments in Australia
2013 disestablishments in Australia
Multiculturalism in Australia